Qi Jia (born August 9, 1984 in Changchun) is a Chinese ice dancer. She competes with Sun Xu. They are the 2002 & 2003 Chinese national silver medalists and the 2001 national bronze medalists. Their highest placement at an ISU championship was 10th at the 2002 Four Continents Championships.

Results
(with Sun)

External links
 

Chinese female ice dancers
1984 births
Living people
Figure skaters from Changchun
Competitors at the 2005 Winter Universiade